Lotts Creek Township is a township in Kossuth County, Iowa, United States.

History
Lotts Creek Township (formerly Lott's Creek with apostrophe s) was organized in 1873. Lotts Creek Township takes its name from the Lotts Creek, which in turn was named for Henry Lott, the figure made notorious for murdering Sidominadotah and Sidominadotah's family in the Spirit Lake Massacre.

References

Townships in Kossuth County, Iowa
Townships in Iowa
1873 establishments in Iowa
Populated places established in 1873